Hypsopygia tabidalis is a species of snout moth in the genus Hypsopygia. It was described by Warren in 1891. It is found in Peru.

References

Moths described in 1891
Pyralini